Crawford is an unincorporated community in Lewis County, West Virginia, United States. Crawford had a post office, which closed on January 21, 1989; it still has its own ZIP code, 26343.

The community was named in honor of a pioneer settler.

References

Unincorporated communities in Lewis County, West Virginia
Unincorporated communities in West Virginia